The Roman Catholic Diocese of Polokwane is a diocese located in the city of Polokwane in the Ecclesiastical province of Pretoria in South Africa.

History
 December 22, 1910: Established as Apostolic Prefecture of Northern Transvaal from the Apostolic Vicariate of Transvaal
 June 13, 1939: Promoted as Territorial Prelature of Pietersburg
 December 15, 1988: Promoted as Diocese of Pietersburg
 September 4, 2009: Name changed - Diocese of Polokwane

Special churches
 The sacred heart cathedral in biccard street is the seat of the Bishop
.

Leadership
 Prefects Apostolic of Northern Transvaal (Roman rite)
 Fr. Ildefonso Lanslots, O.S.B. (1911 – 1922)
 Fr. Salvatore van Nuffel, O.S.B. (1922.03.21 – 1939)
 Prelates of Pietersburg (Roman rite)
 Bishop Frederic Osterrath, O.S.B. (1939.11.14 – 1952)
 Bishop Francis Clement van Hoeck, O.S.B. (1954.01.06 – 1975)
 Bishop Fulgence Werner Le Roy, O.S.B. (1975.07.10 – 1988.12.15 see below)
 Bishops of Pietersburg (Roman rite)
 Bishop Fulgence Werner Le Roy, O.S.B. (see above 1988.12.15 – 2000.02.17)
 Bishop Mogale Paul Nkhumishe (2000.02.17 - 2009.09.04 see below)
 Bishops of Polokwane (Roman rite)
 Bishop Mogale Paul Nkhumishe (see above 2009.09.04 - 2011.12.09)
 Bishop Jeremiah Madimetja Masela (2013.06.10 - present)

See also
Roman Catholicism in South Africa
Pietersburg Abbey

References

Sources
 GCatholic.org 
 Catholic Hierarchy 

Roman Catholic dioceses in South Africa
Christian organizations established in 1910
Roman Catholic dioceses and prelatures established in the 20th century
Roman Catholic Ecclesiastical Province of Pretoria